Joseph Norman Busbridge (23 October 1887 – 27 June 1953) was an Australian rules footballer who played with Essendon in the Victorian Football League (VFL).

Family
The son of William Ethebert Busbridge (1861-1937) and Margaret Jane Busbridge (1870-1895), née Smith, and the brother of Bill Busbridge, he was born on 23 October 1887. He died on 27 June 1953. He married Emma Mary Fletcher Hollingworth (1883-1949) on 12 April 1911. They had a son, Ronald (1917-).

Football
Recruited from Essendon Association Football Club in the VFA, he played in five of the first six games in the 1907 season for the Essendon Football Club, missing round three due to injury, each of them alongside his brother Bill. Busbridge transferred to Williamstown in the VFA in 1912 and played 59 games and kicked 24 goals from 1912-15 and 1919-20, his career being interrupted by war service, as detailed below. Busbridge was vice-captain in 1914 before resigning in June in the belief that the role was effecting his on-field performance. He became coach of Williamstown Juniors in 1921 before resigning in July and being replaced by future Williamstown coach for part of 1931 and all of 1932, Jim Toohey.

Military service 
He served in the First AIF. He enlisted on 17 August 1914. His Service Record simply notes that he was discharged as "medically unfit" on 27 August 1914. He successfully re-enlisted on 17 January 1916, with his enlistment declaration indicating that the grounds upon which he had been discharged in 1914 was to do with his teeth. He was discharged in June 1919, having served overseas in France, and having attained the rank of Corporal.

Notes

References
 World War One Nominal Roll: Joseph Norman Busbridge (20062), Australian War Memorial.
 World War One Embarkation Roll: Joseph Norman Busbridge (20062), Australian War Memorial.
 World War One Nominal Roll: Corporal Joseph Norman Busbridge (20062), The AIF Project: UNSW Canberra at the Australian Defence Force Academy.
 World War One Service Record: Corporal Joseph Norman Busbridge (20062), National Archives of Australia — His first enlistment (dated 14 August 1914), with matching signature, was as "Norman Joseph Busbridge"; his second enlistment (dated 17 January 1916), with matching signature, was as "Joseph Norman Busbridge".
 
 Maplestone, M., Flying Higher: History of the Essendon Football Club 1872–1996, Essendon Football Club, (Melbourne), 1996.

External links 
		

1887 births
1953 deaths
Australian rules footballers from Melbourne
Essendon Football Club players
Australian military personnel of World War I
Military personnel from Melbourne
People from Essendon, Victoria